Market Drayton Town Football Club is a football club based in Market Drayton, Shropshire, England.

History
The club was established in 1969 as Little Drayton Rangers. They became members of the Shropshire County League and were champions in 1991–92, also winning the Shropshire Premier Cup. In 1998 they joined Division One North of the West Midlands (Regional) League. They were runners-up in their first season in the division, only missing out on the title after having three points deducted, and were promoted to the Premier Division.

In 2000–01 Little Drayton won the Premier Cup again and went on to retain it the following season. In 2003 the club was renamed Market Drayton Town, the name of a former club that had won the Shropshire County League in 1955–56. They won the Premier Cup Cup again in 2003–04 and retained it in each of the next two seasons.  After finishing as runners-up in the Premier Division in 2004–05, the club were champions the following season, securing promotion to the Midland Alliance.

The 2008–09 season saw Market Drayton win the Midland Alliance, resulting in promotion to Division One South of the Northern Premier League. They won the Premier Cup again in 2010–11 and 2015–16.

Honours
West Midlands (Regional) League
Premier Division champions 2005–06
Midland Alliance
Champions 2008–09
League Cup winners 2008–09
Shropshire Premier Cup
Winners 1991–92, 2003–04, 2004–05, 2005–06, 2010–11, 2015–16

Records
Best FA Cup performance: Second qualifying round, 2007–08, 2010–11
Best FA Trophy performance: First qualifying round, 2010–11, 2014–15, 2015–16
Best FA Vase performance: Fifth Round, 2008–09
Record attendance: 440 vs AFC Telford United, friendly, 11 June 2009

See also
Market Drayton Town F.C. players
Market Drayton Town F.C. managers

References

External links
Official website

 
Football clubs in England
Football clubs in Shropshire
Association football clubs established in 1969
1969 establishments in England
Shropshire County Premier Football League
West Midlands (Regional) League
Midland Football Alliance
Northern Premier League clubs
Market Drayton